Sitt may refer to:

Gann Academy, coeducational Jewish high school located in Waltham, Massachusetts
Hans Sitt (1850–1922), Bohemian violinist and composer. 
Joseph Sitt (born 1964), American real estate investor
Peter Sitt (1969), German swimmer
SITT Daallo, Somali football club based in Mogadishu, Somalia